Sphingomonas soli  is a Gram-negative, non-spore-forming and rod-shaped bacteria from the genus of Sphingomonas which has been isolated from soil from a ginseng field in Korea. Sphingomonas soli produces beta-glucosidase.

References

Further reading

External links
Type strain of Sphingomonas soli at BacDive -  the Bacterial Diversity Metadatabase	

soli
Bacteria described in 2006